Tagetes pusilla, the lesser marigold, is a Latin American species of marigolds in the family Asteraceae. It is native Central America and western South America from Guatemala to northern Argentina.

Tagetes pusilla is a small annual herb rarely more than 10 cm (4 inches) tall. Leaves are deeply dissected, the leaflets reduced to threads. One plant a few small flower heads, each containing 1-3 white ray florets surrounding 8-10 disc florets.

References

External links
Plant Profile for Tagetes pusilla USDA

Missouri Botanical Garden

pusilla
Flora of South America
Flora of Central America
Plants described in 1818
Taxa named by Carl Sigismund Kunth